Joel Gustavo Acosta (born 16 January 1991) is an Argentine footballer who plays as a midfielder.

Career

Club
Acosta made his professional debut for Boca Juniors on 24 October 2010 in a league game against Independiente Avellaneda. He came on as a substitute for Lucas Viatri in the 88th minute. The game ended 0-0. A little less than a year later, Acosta joined Italian Serie A club Siena on loan. His spell with Siena was unsuccessful as he failed to make an appearance and only made the club's bench on two occasions; both in the Coppa Italia. Shortly after returning to Boca, he was loaned out again as he agreed to join Primera B Nacional side Almirante Brown. He made his debut on 12 August 2012 versus Independiente Rivadavia. He made 25 appearances in all competitions for Almirante Brown before going back to his parent club. In the year and a half later, he played seven times for Boca in the Argentine Primera División. 2015 saw him join Olimpo on loan, he featured 25 times for Olimpo before departing.

In January 2016, Acosta left Boca Juniors and signed for Italian Serie B team Pescara. His first appearance in Italian football came on 12 February in a 1–1 draw against Vicenza. He participated in nine league matches for Pescara as the club won promotion to Serie A. Despite this, Acosta left Pescara soon after 2015–16 to return to Argentina to join Primera División club Aldosivi. He scored his first goal for Aldosivi in October 2016 versus San Martín.

Career statistics

Club
.

References

External links
 

1991 births
Living people
People from Rosario Department
Argentine expatriate footballers
Argentine footballers
Association football midfielders
Boca Juniors footballers
A.C.N. Siena 1904 players
Club Almirante Brown footballers
Olimpo footballers
Delfino Pescara 1936 players
Aldosivi footballers
O'Higgins F.C. footballers
Apollon Smyrnis F.C. players
Liverpool F.C. (Montevideo) players
Chilean Primera División players
Argentine Primera División players
Primera Nacional players
Serie A players
Serie B players
Super League Greece players
Uruguayan Primera División players
Expatriate footballers in Chile
Expatriate footballers in Italy
Expatriate footballers in Greece
Expatriate footballers in Uruguay
Argentine expatriate sportspeople in Chile
Argentine expatriate sportspeople in Italy
Argentine expatriate sportspeople in Greece
Argentine expatriate sportspeople in Uruguay
Sportspeople from Santa Fe Province